Azamgarh division  is an administrative unit of Indian state of Uttar Pradesh. Azamgarh division consists of:-

 Azamgarh District
 Ballia District
 Mau District

See also
 Districts of Uttar Pradesh

References

 
Divisions of Uttar Pradesh